Abel Mustieles García (born 26 August 1991) is a Spanish mountain bike trials cyclist and a 4-time 20 inch world champion.

He created the brand Clean Trials in 2014.

References

1991 births
Living people
Spanish male cyclists
Mountain bike trials riders
People from Bajo Aragón-Caspe
Sportspeople from the Province of Zaragoza
Cyclists from Aragon